Song Dong-hyeon (born 17 November 1981) is a South Korean athlete. He competed in the men's javelin throw at the 2000 Summer Olympics.

References

1981 births
Living people
Athletes (track and field) at the 2000 Summer Olympics
South Korean male javelin throwers
Olympic athletes of South Korea
Place of birth missing (living people)